("from the earlier") and  ("from the later") are Latin phrases used in philosophy to distinguish types of knowledge, justification, or argument by their reliance on empirical evidence or experience.  knowledge is independent from current experience (e.g., as part of a new study). Examples include mathematics, tautologies, and deduction from pure reason.  knowledge depends on empirical evidence. Examples include most fields of science and aspects of personal knowledge.

The terms originate from the analytic methods found in Organon, a collection of works by Aristotle. Prior analytics is about deductive logic, which comes from definitions and first principles. Posterior analytics is about inductive logic, which comes from observational evidence.

Both terms appear in Euclid's Elements and were popularized by Immanuel Kant's Critique of Pure Reason, an influential work in the history of philosophy. Both terms are primarily used as modifiers to the noun "knowledge" (i.e. " knowledge").  can be used to modify other nouns such as "truth". Philosophers may use apriority, apriorist, and aprioricity as nouns referring to the quality of being .

Examples

A priori 
Consider the proposition: "If George V reigned at least four days, then he reigned more than three days." This is something that one knows a priori because it expresses a statement that one can derive by reason alone.

A posteriori 
Consider the proposition: "George V reigned from 1910 to 1936." This is something that (if true) one must come to know a posteriori because it expresses an empirical fact unknowable by reason alone.

Aprioricity, analyticity, and necessity

Relation to the analytic-synthetic

Several philosophers, in reaction to Immanuel Kant, sought to explain a priori knowledge without appealing to, as Paul Boghossian explains, "a special faculty [intuition] … that has never been described in satisfactory terms." One theory, popular among the logical positivists of the early 20th century, is what Boghossian calls the "analytic explanation of the a priori." The distinction between analytic and synthetic propositions was first introduced by Kant. While his original distinction was primarily drawn in terms of conceptual containment, the contemporary version of such distinction primarily involves, as American philosopher W. V. O. Quine put it, the notions of "true by virtue of meanings and independently of fact."

Analytic propositions are thought to be true in virtue of their meaning alone, while a posteriori propositions are thought to be true in virtue of their meaning and of certain facts about the world. According to the analytic explanation of the a priori, all a priori knowledge is analytic; so a priori knowledge need not require a special faculty of pure intuition, since it can be accounted for simply by one's ability to understand the meaning of the proposition in question. More simply, proponents of this explanation claimed to have reduced a dubious metaphysical faculty of pure reason to a legitimate linguistic notion of analyticity.

The analytic explanation of a priori knowledge has undergone several criticisms. Most notably, Quine argues that the analytic–synthetic distinction is illegitimate:But for all its a priori reasonableness, a boundary between analytic and synthetic statements simply has not been drawn. That there is such a distinction to be drawn at all is an unempirical dogma of empiricists, a metaphysical article of faith.While the soundness of Quine's critique is highly disputed, it had a powerful effect on the project of explaining the a priori in terms of the analytic.

Relation to the necessary truths and contingent truths
The metaphysical distinction between necessary and contingent truths has also been related to a priori and a posteriori knowledge.

A proposition that is necessarily true is one in which its negation is self-contradictory. Furthermore, it is said to be true in every possible world. For example, considering the proposition "all bachelors are unmarried:" its negation (i.e. the proposition that some bachelors are married) is incoherent due to the concept of being unmarried (or the meaning of the word "unmarried") being tied to part of the concept of being a bachelor (or part of the definition of the word "bachelor"). To the extent that contradictions are impossible, self-contradictory propositions are necessarily false as it is impossible for them to be true. The negation of a self-contradictory proposition is, therefore, supposed to be necessarily true.

By contrast, a proposition that is contingently true is one in which its negation is not self-contradictory. Thus, it is said not to be true in every possible world. As Jason Baehr suggests, it seems plausible that all necessary propositions are known a priori, because "[s]ense experience can tell us only about the actual world and hence about what is the case; it can say nothing about what must or must not be the case."

Following Kant, some philosophers have considered the relationship between aprioricity, analyticity, and necessity to be extremely close. According to Jerry Fodor, "positivism, in particular, took it for granted that a priori truths must be necessary." However, since Kant, the distinction between analytic and synthetic propositions has slightly changed. Analytic propositions were largely taken to be "true by virtue of meanings and independently of fact," while synthetic propositions were not—one must conduct some sort of empirical investigation, looking to the world, to determine the truth-value of synthetic propositions.

Aprioricity, analyticity and necessity
Aprioricity, analyticity, and necessity have since been more clearly separated from each other. American philosopher Saul Kripke (1972), for example, provides strong arguments against this position, whereby he contends that there are necessary a posteriori truths. For example, the proposition that water is H2O (if it is true): According to Kripke, this statement is both necessarily true, because water and H2O are the same thing, they are identical in every possible world, and truths of identity are logically necessary; and a posteriori, because it is known only through empirical investigation. Following such considerations of Kripke and others (see Hilary Putnam), philosophers tend to distinguish the notion of aprioricity more clearly from that of necessity and analyticity.

Kripke's definitions of these terms, however, diverge in subtle ways from those of Kant. Taking these differences into account, Kripke's controversial analysis of naming as contingent and a priori would, according to Stephen Palmquist, best fit into Kant's epistemological framework by calling it "analytic a posteriori." Aaron Sloman presented a brief defence of Kant's three distinctions (analytic/synthetic, apriori/empirical, and necessary/contingent), in that it did not assume "possible world semantics" for the third distinction, merely that some part of this world might have been different.

The relationship between aprioricity, necessity, and analyticity is not found to be easy to discern. However, most philosophers at least seem to agree that while the various distinctions may overlap, the notions are clearly not identical: the a priori/a posteriori distinction is epistemological; the analytic/synthetic distinction is linguistic; and the necessary/contingent distinction is metaphysical.

History

Early uses
The term a priori is Latin for 'from what comes before' (or, less literally, 'from first principles, before experience'). In contrast, the term a posteriori is Latin for 'from what comes later' (or 'after experience').

They appear in Latin translations of Euclid's Elements, a work widely considered during the early European modern period as the model for precise thinking.

An early philosophical use of what might be considered a notion of a priori knowledge (though not called by that name) is Plato's theory of recollection, related in the dialogue Meno, according to which something like a priori knowledge is knowledge inherent, intrinsic in the human mind.

Albert of Saxony, a 14th-century logician, wrote on both a priori and a posteriori.

The early modern Thomistic philosopher John Sergeant differentiates the terms by the direction of inference regarding proper causes and effects. To demonstrate something a priori is to "Demonstrate Proper Effects from Proper Efficient Causes" and likewise to demonstrate a posteriori is to demonstrate "Proper Efficient Causes from Proper Effects", according to his 1696 work The Method to Science Book III, Lesson IV, Section 7.

G. W. Leibniz introduced a distinction between a priori and a posteriori criteria for the possibility of a notion in his (1684) short treatise "Meditations on Knowledge, Truth, and Ideas". A priori and a posteriori arguments for the existence of God appear in his Monadology (1714).

George Berkeley outlined the distinction in his 1710 work A Treatise Concerning the Principles of Human Knowledge (para. XXI).

Immanuel Kant
The 18th-century German philosopher Immanuel Kant (1781) advocated a blend of rationalist and empiricist theories. Kant says, "Although all our cognition begins with experience, it does not follow that it arises from [is caused by] experience." According to Kant, a priori cognition is transcendental, or based on the form of all possible experience, while a posteriori cognition is empirical, based on the content of experience: It is quite possible that our empirical knowledge is a compound of that which we receive through impressions, and that which the faculty of cognition supplies from itself sensuous impressions [sense data] giving merely the occasion [opportunity for a cause to produce its effect]. Contrary to contemporary usages of the term, Kant believes that a priori knowledge is not entirely independent of the content of experience. Unlike the rationalists, Kant thinks that a priori cognition, in its pure form, that is without the admixture of any empirical content, is limited to the deduction of the conditions of possible experience. These a priori, or transcendental conditions, are seated in one's cognitive faculties, and are not provided by experience in general or any experience in particular (although an argument exists that a priori intuitions can be "triggered" by experience).

Kant nominated and explored the possibility of a transcendental logic with which to consider the deduction of the a priori in its pure form. Space, time and causality are considered pure a priori intuitions. Kant reasoned that the pure a priori intuitions are established via his transcendental aesthetic and transcendental logic. He claimed that the human subject would not have the kind of experience that it has were these a priori forms not in some way constitutive of him as a human subject. For instance, a person would not experience the world as an orderly, rule-governed place unless time, space and causality were determinant functions in the form of perceptual faculties, i. e., there can be no experience in general without space, time or causality as particular determinants thereon. The claim is more formally known as Kant's transcendental deduction and it is the central argument of his major work, the Critique of Pure Reason. The transcendental deduction argues that time, space and causality are ideal as much as real. In consideration of a possible logic of the a priori, this most famous of Kant's deductions has made the successful attempt in the case for the fact of subjectivity, what constitutes subjectivity and what relation it holds with objectivity and the empirical.

Johann Fichte
After Kant's death, a number of philosophers saw themselves as correcting and expanding his philosophy, leading to the various forms of German Idealism. One of these philosophers was Johann Fichte. His student (and critic), Arthur Schopenhauer, accused him of rejecting the distinction between a priori and a posteriori knowledge:

See also

A priori probability
Ab initio
Abductive reasoning
Deductive reasoning
Inductive reasoning
Off the verandah
Relativized a priori
Tabula rasa
Transcendental empiricism
Transcendental hermeneutic phenomenology
Transcendental nominalism

References

Notes

Citations

Sources

Further reading

 
 
 .

External links 

 
 
 
 
 A priori / a posteriori – in the Philosophical Dictionary online.
 "Rationalism vs. Empiricism" – an article by Peter Markie in the Stanford Encyclopedia of Philosophy.

 
Concepts in epistemology
Conceptual distinctions
Critical thinking
Critical thinking skills
Empiricism
Justification (epistemology)
Kantianism
Latin logical phrases
Latin philosophical phrases
Mental processes
Philosophical logic
Philosophical theories
Philosophy of logic
Philosophy of mind
Rationalism
Reality
Sources of knowledge
Subjective experience
Term logic
Thought